The Army of Kentucky was a Confederate army during the American Civil War.

The designation "Army of Kentucky" was given August 25, 1862 to the field army Kirby Smith led into eastern Kentucky during the Confederate Heartland Offensive. The army was drawn from troops of the Confederate Department of Eastern Tennessee, which had been created with Smith as commander in February 1862.

The army consisted of the infantry divisions of Henry Heth, Patrick Cleburne, Thomas J. Churchill and Carter L. Stevenson and two small cavalry brigades under John Morgan and John S. Scott. After the Battle of Perryville, Kirby Smith was promoted and given command of the Department of Trans-Mississippi, and the army was incorporated into the Army of Tennessee.

Notes

References
 Boatner, Mark Mayo, III. The Civil War Dictionary. New York: McKay, 1959; revised 1988. .

1862 establishments in the Confederate States of America
1862 disestablishments in the Confederate States of America
Kentucky
Kentucky in the American Civil War
Tennessee in the American Civil War